Type 919 hospital ship is a type of hospital ship (AH) built in the People’s Republic of China (PRC) for the People's Liberation Army Navy (PLAN). Type 919 hospital ship has received NATO reporting name Anshen class (meaning soothing the nerves). Two ships have been built by end of 2021.

Displaced more than four thousand tons when fully loaded, Type 919 hospital ship is designed to fill the gap between smaller Qiongsha-class ambulance transport (APH) and much larger Type 920 hospital ship (AH). Type 919 hospital ship is equipped with more than a hundred hospital beds, internal medicine, ophthalmology, otorhinolaryngology, psychology and surgery departments, and can support three surgeries to be performed onboard simultaneously. In addition, the ship is also equipped with helipad.

References

Auxiliary ships of the People's Liberation Army Navy